Neoregelia smithii is a species of flowering plant in the genus Neoregelia. This species is native to Brazil.

Cultivars
 Neoregelia 'Aussie Opal'
 Neoregelia 'Blueberry Muffin'
 Neoregelia 'Caviar'
 Neoregelia 'Damask Rose'
 Neoregelia 'Garden King'
 Neoregelia 'Ink Spots'
 Neoregelia 'Java Plum'
 Neoregelia 'Oppenheimer'
 Neoregelia 'Purple Gem'
 Neoregelia 'Wine and Gold'

References

BSI Cultivar Registry Retrieved 11 October 2009

smithii
Flora of Brazil